Jeffrey Stanley Lena (born 1958) is an American lawyer based in Berkeley, California, who represents the Holy See in civil lawsuits in the United States.  Some such suits accuse the Vatican of complicity in sexual abuse by priests and money laundering.  He has also been involved in protecting the Vatican Museum's copyrights.  In 2000 he successfully defended the Vatican against a lawsuit filed by Holocaust survivors from Croatia, Ukraine, and Yugoslavia that claimed that the Vatican Bank accepted millions of dollars of their valuables stolen by Nazi sympathizers.

He grew up in Berkeley, California.  He graduated with honors from the University of California at Santa Cruz and did graduate work in history at the University of California at Berkeley.  He studied law at the University of California, Hastings College of the Law, and at the University of Milan.  He taught law at the University of Turin.

References

External links 
 Lawyer profile at martindale.com
 The man who provides counsel to the Pope and Vatican

Living people
American lawyers
University of California, Santa Cruz alumni
Year of birth uncertain
1958 births